Khrysanti Yanisivna Dimopulos (born 21 May 1987), better known as Santa Dimopulos, is a Ukrainian singer of Assyrian-Greek descent. The champion of the 2011 WBPF World Championship in the category "World Women Model Physique 165 cm+." The winner of a Ukrainian TV show Dancing with the Stars 2020.

Biography 
In 2006 she earned 3rd place in the Miss Ukraine Universe pageant.

She is a former member of the Ukrainian musical group Nu Virgos, known as VIA Gra in Ukraine (2011–2012). She is also a former member of the Russian girl group Queens (2016–2017), formed as a trio of ex-Nu Virgos singers.

Notes

References

External links
 
 
 

Living people
21st-century Ukrainian women singers
Ukrainian female bodybuilders
Ukrainian people of Greek descent
1987 births